The Life of the Saints of Zalka – Zsihovics – Debreczeni is a large-scale 19th century hagiographic work.

History 

Among the works entitled The Life of Saints in Hungarian, the most extensive work to date was published between 1859 and 1876 in Eger and Budapest by János Zalka, Ferenc Zsihovics and János Debreczeni. The large-scale work is more than 2,100 pages long and contains the biographies of thousands of people revered as saints in calendar order. The work has neither a facsimile nor an electronic edition to this day.

Order of volumes

Sources 
 Petrik Géza: Magyar Könyvészet, https://www.arcanum.hu/hu/online-kiadvanyok/Petrik-magyar-konyveszet-17121920-2/18601875-1053F/zsihovics-ferencz-szentek-elete-5-resz-k-8r-eger-186176-erseki-lyceum-budapest-szt-istvan-t-1150-i-resz-irta-zalka-janos-2-kiad-1302A/

Hungarian encyclopedias